Scramble is the second album by American punk rock band The Coathangers. It was released on April 7, 2009 on Suicide Squeeze Records.

Critical reception
Scramble received mostly favorable reviews from critics. One such review was written by Robert Christgau, who described the album's music as "postpunk in the angular Gof4 tradition that femme bands long ago realized left room to squeeze high voices in edgewise." An exception to this trend was Chris Parkin, who wrote in NME that "these four grrrls from Atlanta will send more people off cliff-faces with their yelping, hysterical art-punk than they ever will into HMV to buy this." Another mixed review was written by Matthew Fiander, who wrote in PopMatters that "Scramble is a very solid record, but if anything it shows us the Coathangers’ talents have outgrown their humble garage sound."

Track listing

Personnel
Julie Kugel (Crook Kid Coathanger) – Guitar, vocals
Stephanie Luke (Rusty Coathanger) – Drums, vocals
Meredith Franco (Minnie Coathanger) – Bass guitar, vocals
Candice Jones (Bebe Coathanger) – Keyboard, vocals

References

2009 albums
Suicide Squeeze Records albums
The Coathangers albums